Scaphimyia is a genus of flies in the family Tachinidae.

Species
S. castanea Mesnil, 1955
S. nigrobasicasta Chao & Shi, 1982
S. takanoi Mesnil, 1967

References

Exoristinae
Diptera of Asia
Tachinidae genera